Adalsinda or Adalsindis of Hamay and Eusebia of Douai, were 7th-century Columban nuns, who were sisters from a prominent Merovingian family; Eusebia became an Abbess. They are venerated as saints in the Catholic and Eastern Orthodox Churches. Their parents were Richtrudis, a Gascoigne-Basque heiress, and Adalbard I of Ostrevent, a Frankish duke of Douai. Both mother and father are also recognised as saints, as are another sister, Clotsinda, and a brother, Maurontius. They are especially venerated in Northern France and Flanders.

Eusebia's commemoration is on 16 March; Adalsinda's feast day is 25 December, around the date of her death, by tradition "during the solemnities of Christmas".

The two abbeys
Following their father's death in an attack, near Périgueux, the sisters' mother, Richtrudis, retired to the Marchiennes Abbey that she and her husband had founded in 630. Her three daughters accompanied her there. All four became nuns, Richtrudis taking the role of abbess at Marchiennes. As Marchiennes had been made a dual monastery by Richtrudis around 647, her son Maurontius, once he became a monk, was also at the same abbey for a time. The abbey followed the Rule of Saint Columbanus from its founding until 1024, when it became a Benedictine monastery. 

The earlier established Hamay Abbey nearby at Wandignies-Hamage was located on the opposite side of the river Scarpe; it, too, had a connection to the family, being overseen by the sisters' paternal great-grandmother who was its founding abbess, . The smaller Hamay Abbey was later absorbed by its larger neighbour, Marchienne, possibly when Marchienne became a solely male Benedictine establishment in 1024.

Adalsinda
Later she went to the abbey at Hamay, where her sister Eusebia had become abbess in succession to their great-grandmother, Saint Gertrude. Gertrudes's widowed daughter, Gerberta –who was Adalbard's mother, and so the sisters' grandmother– was also a nun of Hamay Abbey. Clotsinda remained at Marchiennes, with her mother.

For example, authors P.F.X. de Ram (1866) and Dunbar (1904) give this earlier timing for her death. Writing in 2007, Dries van den Akker, a Jesuit author and editor stated, "more recent sources, which are based on historical research, give the year 715 as her date of death". This is the year given in the 1921 Benedictines of Ramsgate's Book of Saints and a 1945 essay by Cristiani. At least one modern work (1985) shows both years for Adalsinda's death in different sections, as Akker notes.

Eusebia
Saint Eusebia of Douai was born about 637, the eldest daughter of Richtrudis (or Rictrude) and Adalbard. Maurontius of Douai was her elder brother. According to Dunbar's 1904 Dictionary of Saintly Women, Queen Nanthild was Eusebia's godmother and had gifted her with the fine estate of Verny near Soissons.

This was at the request of her great-grandmother and founding abbess of Hamay, Saint Gertrude. In thus adopting a family member as her protégé, Gertrude's actions are consistent with the monastic system of the time. Controlled by the ruling, landholding class that was closely linked to the Merovingian monarchy, ensuring succession by close relatives was a way to retain power and prestige within families.

Before her death, Gertrude named Eusebia her successor and she was duly elected abbess upon her great-grandmother's demise. Eusebia was but twelve years old, and her mother considering her too young for such responsibility, placed Hamay under the direction of Marchiennes. Eusebia eventually returned to Hamay, where she assumed her role of abbess. Her younger sister Adalsinda later joined her there. Abbess Eusebia died around 680. In Belgium and northern France she is called Ysoie, Isoie or Eusoye.

Notes

References

Further reading
 
 
 
 

637 births
680 deaths
7th-century Frankish saints
Christian female saints of the Middle Ages
7th-century Frankish women